Gerry Glaude (November 10, 1927 – January 9, 2017) was a Canadian professional ice hockey defenceman.

As a member of the Muskegon Zephyrs, Glaude was named to the IHL First All-Star Team in three consecutive years (1961 to 1963). During the 1962–63, Glaude became the first defenceman in the history of professional hockey to score 100 points in a single season.

Awards and honours

References

External links

1927 births
2017 deaths
Canadian expatriate ice hockey players in the United States
Ice hockey people from Quebec
Canadian ice hockey defencemen
Chicoutimi Saguenéens (QSHL) players
Muskegon Zephyrs players
New Haven Ramblers players
New York Rovers players
Quebec Aces (AHL) players
Sportspeople from Salaberry-de-Valleyfield